Sandra Klösel (born 22 June 1979) is a former tennis player from Germany.

Kösel turned professional in July 1995, and won nine singles and six doubles titles on the ITF Circuit. In March 2007, she reached her career-high singles ranking of world No. 87. On 1 October 2007, she peaked at No. 128 in the doubles rankings.

ITF Circuit finals

Singles: 20 (8–12)

Doubles: 12 (6–6)

External links

 
 
 
 

1979 births
Living people
People from Oberkirch (Baden)
Sportspeople from Freiburg (region)
German female tennis players
Tennis people from Baden-Württemberg